Józef Bujak (October 31, 1898 – April 22, 1949) was a Polish cross-country skier who competed in the 1928 Winter Olympics.

He was born and died in Zakopane.

In 1928 he finished 18th in the 18 kilometre event and 19th in the 50 kilometre competition.

External links
 Cross-country skiing 1928 

1898 births
1949 deaths
Polish male cross-country skiers
Olympic cross-country skiers of Poland
Cross-country skiers at the 1928 Winter Olympics
Sportspeople from Zakopane